Asian Club Volleyball Championships may refer to:
 Asian Men's Club Volleyball Championship, the competition for men
 Asian Women's Club Volleyball Championship, the competition for women